Antihero is the debut studio album by Australian rapper Huskii, released on 11 February 2022 through Island Records Australia. The album is characterised by its boom bap production style, which was overseen by Sydney producer Tasker (producer). Huskii will tour in support of the album from April 2022.

Supported by the singles "Ruin My Life" and "Toxic", Antihero debuted at number one on the ARIA Albums Chart.

Background
After four EPs released from 2017 to 2020, Antihero is Huskii's debut album. Although seven tracks and 19 minutes long, it is intended as his first studio album. Huskii said after spending two years "in and out of jail" he had little motivation to write songs, but after getting out and "liv[ing] life" he got back to "being motivated". He said it "made sense" to title the album Antihero because he has "related to antiheroes" and "been an outlier" his "whole life". He further described the album as "proper Sydney music that will live forever".

Singles
Antihero was supported by two singles.

"Ruin My Life" was released as the lead single on 12 November 2021.

"Toxic" was released as the second single on 16 February 2022.

Track listing

Charts

References

2022 debut albums
Huskii albums
Island Records Australia albums